The 2010 West Lancashire Borough Council election took place on 6 May 2010 to elect members of  West Lancashire Borough Council in Lancashire, England. One third of the council was up for election and the Conservative Party stayed in overall control of the council.

After the election, the composition of the council was:
Conservative 31
Labour 21
Independent 1
Vacant 1

Background
Since the council was created in 1973 West Lancashire has alternated between the Conservative and Labour parties. The Conservatives gained control of the council in the 2002 election and since then had increased their majority. This meant that before the 2010 election the Conservatives held 33 of the 54 seats on the council as compared to 16 for Labour, 2 independents and a number of vacancies. The third party nationally, the Liberal Democrats, had no councillors in West Lancashire and did not stand any candidates in the election.

Campaign
19 seats were being contested in the 2010 election, including the normal 18 seats and one by-election. The by-election in Scott ward came after the resignation of Conservative Geoff Hammond in March, meaning that 2 councillors would be elected from the ward in 2010. As well as the Conservative and Labour parties, there were also several Green party candidates and one English Democrat who was standing in Ashurst ward.

The Conservatives' strong majority before the election meant it was seen as being almost certain that they would remain in control of the council. They were defending 14 of the 19 seats being contested, but were still hoping to make some gains. The Conservatives pointed to their record in freezing Council Tax, while making improvements in services and local parks.

Meanwhile, Labour pointed to their candidates and the increased turnout due to the election taking place at the same time as the general election, as factors leading them to hope they would make gains. They targeted the wards of Burscough East, Burscough West and Scott, while also hoping to make progress elsewhere in the north of the council.

Election result
The results saw the Conservatives stay in control of the council despite losing 3 council seats to reduce their majority to 8 seats. Labour gained the 3 seats from the Conservatives in Burscough West and both seats in Scott ward, with Labour's 41 vote majority in Burscough West being the most marginal of the election. Labour also regained a seat in Up Holland, where the former councillor, David Phythian, had served as an independent after having been suspended from Labour in 2007 due to racist comments. However the Conservative group leader, Ian Grant, was among those who held their seats with the Conservatives remaining safely in control of the council.

Ward results

References

 

2010 English local elections
May 2010 events in the United Kingdom
2010
2010s in Lancashire